J. M. Kporvi was a Ghanaian civil servant, politician and, member of the National Liberation Council. He was the Assistant Commissioner of the Ghana Police Service and the Commissioner for the Northern Region from 1966 to 1967. He was succeeded by Col. P. Laryea.

References 
 

20th-century births
Possibly living people
Ghanaian soldiers
Ghanaian military personnel